Hugh White State Park is a state park in the U.S. state of Mississippi. It is located off Mississippi Highway 8 east of Grenada. It is named after Hugh L. White, a former governor of Mississippi.

Activities and amenities
The park features boating, waterskiing and fishing on  Grenada Lake, 158 developed campsites, 12 duplex cabins, visitors center, picnic area, and an 18-hole regulation golf course, The Dogwoods. The associated Carver Point Group Camp is located across Grenada Lake from the main park area.

References

External links
Hugh White State Park Mississippi Department of Fisheries, Wildlife, and Parks
The Dogwoods Golf Course

State parks of Mississippi
Protected areas of Grenada County, Mississippi